Lande may refer to:

Places
Lande, Østfold, Norway
Lande, Norway, a village in the municipality of Brønnøy in Nordland, Norway
Château de la Lande (disambiguation), various castles in France
Lac de la Lande, a lake in Vosges, France

Other uses
Lande (surname)

See also
Landé g-factor, a type of g-factor
Landé interval rule, a rule in atomic physics

Landes (disambiguation)